Erase may refer to:

Data erasure, a method of software-based overwriting that completely destroys all electronic data
Data remanence, the residual representation of data that has been, in some way, nominally erased or removed
Erase (album), a 1994 death metal album by Gorefest
"Erase/Rewind", a 1998 pop/rock song by The Cardigans
"Erase", a song by All That Remains from the 2002 album Behind Silence and Solitude

See also
Deletion (disambiguation)
Erased (disambiguation)
Eraser (disambiguation)